Straumen Chapel is a parish church of the Church of Norway in Sørreisa Municipality in Troms og Finnmark county, Norway. It is located in the village of Sørreisa. It is one of the churches for the Sørreisa parish which is part of the Senja prosti (deanery) in the Diocese of Nord-Hålogaland. The white, brick church was built in a rectangular design in 1973 using plans drawn up by the architect Elisabeth Breen Fidjestøl. The church seats about 170 people.

There is a free standing bell tower to the east of the main entrance. The church includes a parish hall, offices, and lounge area that includes two ping pong tables. In 2014, the church was renovated and a new chancel was added to enlarge the sanctuary.

See also
List of churches in Nord-Hålogaland

References

Sørreisa
Churches in Troms
20th-century Church of Norway church buildings
Churches completed in 1973
1973 establishments in Norway
Brick churches in Norway
Rectangular churches in Norway